Runnelstown is a census-designated place and unincorporated community located in Perry County, Mississippi.

A post office operated in Runnelstown from 1909 to 1914.

Jessica Carter, who represented Mississippi at the 2012 Miss Teen USA pageant, was born in Runnelstown.

It was first named as a CDP in the 2020 Census which listed a population of 320.

Demographics

2020 census

Note: the US Census treats Hispanic/Latino as an ethnic category. This table excludes Latinos from the racial categories and assigns them to a separate category. Hispanics/Latinos can be of any race.

Notes

Unincorporated communities in Mississippi
Unincorporated communities in Perry County, Mississippi
Census-designated places in Perry County, Mississippi